Betts Group Pty Ltd (formerly Breckler Brothers and Cecil Bros Pty Ltd) is an Australian footwear retailer based in Perth. The head office is located at Level 2, 428 Scarborough Beach Rd, Osborne Park, Western Australia. Betts have been in the industry for over 125 years, and have recently expanded their operation to include the sale of shoes online. The Betts Group currently owns the brands Betts (formerly Betts & Betts), Betts Kids (formerly Betts & Betts Kids), ZU, Airflex, Zeroe, Betts Brand Direct, Betts for Her. The organisation operates across all Australian states, and owns 67 stores in total (Australia wide).

The business is built on a financial model based on 98% shoe and 2% handbag sales. The business, which is 100% retail, does not manufacture any of its products, and instead imports its footwear and other accessories from overseas suppliers.

The company is unrelated to the laminate tube producer Betts Group, owned by packaging specialist Albéa (formerly Alcan Packaging Beauty).

History
Yoel Breckler, a Russian immigrant, founded the boot repair store Breckler Brothers in Fremantle, Western Australia, in 1892. This family business that he had established was continued by his wife Fanny Breckler (née Masel, 1877–1942) and two sons, Cecil and Alec, after his death in 1912. Fanny opened the first store in Hay Street in the 1920s. The company has since changed its name at various times in its long history, including Cecil Bros, and Betts. In 1985, Andrew and Danny Breckler took over the family's business. The recent introduction of major suburban retail shopping centres had brought in competition from both national and international players. This development had created a difficult situation for local retailers, and put pressure on sales and margins. To combat this, Andrew started to expand the operations into the states of Victoria, New South Wales and the Northern Territory, with the aid of numerous acquisitions the company had made in the 1980s and early 1990s. During this time, Andrew helped the company become the "largest privately owned footwear group in Australia". At the turn of the millennium, Danny, who was faced with a second surge of increased competition, repositioned the Betts Group, thereby changing it into a "vertically integrated business that could design and source its own products". The brand Zu Shoes was established in March 2003, and Danny soon started designing and developing footwear products and accessories for manufacture in China. To reduce the level of third-party involvement in acquiring product from Chinese manufacturers, he also developed the Betts Group China Resource Centre, which handled quality control and transportation.

Legacy
The Betts Group is now run by the fifth generation of the family, and owns stores spanning across all the major shopping centres in Australia. Today, Betts has stores in every Australian state and territory, offices in Western Australia, South Australia, Victoria and China, and a franchise store in the United Arab Emirates. The various brands reach a range of different demographics in society: children's shoes (Betts Kids), premium men and women's fashion footwear and accessories (Zu), and contemporary comfort/technological men's and women's fashion shoes (Airflex). Betts, which caters for people seeking contemporary affordable men and women's dress and casual footwear and accessories, has in some locations been replaced by Betts for Her, a variant of the Betts brand that stocks female-targeted products only. The Betts for Her debut store was at Westfield Burwood in 2012. Numerous international companies order Betts-designed shoes. Over 130 independent retailers in Australia now stock Airflex shoes. Many of the shoes are designed and manufactured by Betts themselves, and this is done to allow them to oversee the quality of the production throughout the entire process. The store team members undergo NO training in shoe fitting, only how to make sure they’re making store budgets. The company also has competitive remuneration packages and various bonus structures due to its "understand[ing of] the importance of its staff members".

 During the 2009 financial year, the FY10 revenue growth (1yr) was −1%, and the five-year revenue growth was 1%.
 For the months of September 2011, December 2011 and March 2012, tenant Betts Group's percent of the portfolio gross rent of the David Jones Building property was 0.7%.
 In support of the Australian Packaging Covenant, Betts pledged to do the following in a 5-year action plan from May 2011 to May 2016:

 Reduction in use of plastic carry bags by customers making footwear purchases
 Influence our supplier of shoe boxes to use recycled material
 Introduction of biodegradable carry bags
 Commitment to review all new packaging based upon the sustainable packaging Guidelines

Construction
The two-storey, 1,500 sqm office Betts Group National Head Office was awarded the Best New Commercial project under $5 million in Western Australia for 2006 by the MBA.

Betts online
Betts' website allows purchases online,

References

External links
 

Shoe companies of Australia
Footwear retailers
Retail companies of Australia
Australian companies established in 1892
Clothing companies established in 1892
Retail companies established in 1892